Joseph E. King (born September 2, 1945) is an American politician in the state of Washington. He served in the Washington House of Representatives from 1981 to 1993. He was Speaker of the House from 1987 to 1993. He sought the Democratic nomination for the 1992 Washington gubernatorial election, but was defeated by Mike Lowry.

References

Living people
1945 births
Democratic Party members of the Washington House of Representatives